The Public Service Commission was evolved under the British India act 1935. Meanwhile, the KP public service Commission (KPPSC) is functional under the ordinance of KPK PSC 1978.
Khyber Pakhtunkhwa Public Service Commission (KPPSC) is an agency of Government of Khyber Pakhtunkhwa that is responsible for recruiting civil servants  and bureaucrats.

See also 

 Federal Public Service Commission
 Punjab Public Service Commission
 Sindh Public Service Commission
 Balochistan Public Service Commission
 Azad Jammu and Kashmir Public Service Commission

References

Government of Khyber Pakhtunkhwa
Provincial public service commissions of Pakistan

Useful Links 

 Khyber Pakhtunkhwa Public Service Commission